Philippe Jean Louis Houben (born 4 June 1881, date of death unknown) was a Belgian-born naturalized French (in 1939) male water polo player. He was a member of the Belgium men's national water polo team. He competed with the team at the 1900 Summer Olympics.

References

External links
 

1881 births
Year of death missing
Belgian male water polo players
Water polo players at the 1900 Summer Olympics
Olympic water polo players of France
Sportspeople from Brussels
Place of death missing
Belgian emigrants to France
Naturalized citizens of France